The Thawri school was a short-lived school of Islamic Jurisprudence. Its founder was Sufyan Al-Thawri, a great 8th century scholar, jurist and hadith compiler.

After Ath-Thawri's move to Basra later in his life, his jurisprudential thought (usul) became more closely aligned to that of the Umayyads and of Al-Awza'i.

He spent the last year of his life hiding after a dispute between him and the Abbasid Caliph Muhammad Ibn Mansur Al-Mahdi. After his death, the Thawri Madhhab was taken up by his students, including notably Yahya al-Qattan. However, his school did not survive, but his jurisprudential thought and especially hadith transmission are highly regarded in Islam, and have influenced all the major schools, although not in the form of organized school like other Madhhabs. 

The reason that the Madhhab of Thawri became extinct was because Sufyan spent most of his later life in hiding, due to his refusal to be assigned as a judge by the Abbasid authority. The second reason was because he instructed his principal student, Ammar ibn Sayf, to destroy and burn all of his works.

References

Islamic jurisprudence
Schools of Sunni jurisprudence